Air Chief Marshal Sir William Elliot,  (3 June 1896 – 27 June 1971) was a senior Royal Air Force commander.

RAF career

Educated at Tonbridge School in the United Kingdom, Elliot joined the Army Service Corps in 1915 and then transferred to the Royal Flying Corps in 1917.

On 30 July 1919 Elliot, then a captain, crashed behind enemy lines while fighting the Bolshevik forces during the North Russia Intervention. Another plane crewed by Lt John Mitchell and Captain Walter Anderson landed and picked up Elliot and flew him and his observer back to the base. He was appointed Officer Commanding No. 501 Squadron in 1932 before becoming Assistant Secretary to Committee of Imperial Defence in 1937 and being made Assistant Secretary of the War Cabinet Secretariat in 1939. He served in the Second World War as Officer Commanding RAF Middle Wallop and as a member of the Air Staff responsible for Night Defences at Headquarters RAF Fighter Command in 1941 and then as Director of Plans at the Air Ministry in 1942. He continued has war service as Air Officer Commanding RAF Gibraltar and then as Air Officer Commanding the RAF's Balkan Air Force during 1944 until he was made Assistant Chief Executive at the Ministry of Aircraft Production in March 1945.

After the War he served as Assistant Chief of the Air Staff (Policy) and then became Air Officer Commanding-in-Chief at RAF Fighter Command in 1947. He was knighted on 1 January 1946. He went on to be Chief Staff Officer to the Minister of Defence in 1949 and Chairman of the British Joint Services Mission to Washington, D.C. and UK Representative on the NATO Standing Group in 1951 before he retired in 1954.

Family
In 1931 he married Rosemary Chancellor, daughter of Sir John Chancellor. Sir William and Lady Elliot had a daughter, Louise, and a son, Simon. In 1970, Louise married Stephen Simmons Halsey, an American corporate executive with American Express; over the course of their lives they have resided in New York City, Paris, Hong Kong, Hawaii, and Oregon. In 1972, Simon married Annabel, the daughter of Bruce Shand and sister of Queen Camilla.

References

 - Total pages: 224 

 

|-
 

|-

|-

1896 births
1971 deaths
People educated at Tonbridge School
Royal Air Force air marshals of World War II
Knights Grand Cross of the Royal Victorian Order
Knights Commander of the Order of the Bath
Knights Commander of the Order of the British Empire
Recipients of the Distinguished Flying Cross (United Kingdom)
Recipients of the Order of St. Vladimir, 4th class
Commanders of the Legion of Merit
Grand Crosses of the Order of the Phoenix (Greece)
British air attachés
British Army personnel of World War I
Royal Army Service Corps officers
Royal Flying Corps officers
Royal Air Force personnel of World War I
Royal Air Force personnel of the Russian Civil War